William A. Driffle (February 20, 1826 - June 9, 1890) was a member of the South Carolina House of Representatives during the Reconstruction era, representing Colleton County.

He is buried in Walterboro's Live Oak Cemetery.

References

External links
 

Members of the South Carolina House of Representatives
1826 births
1890 deaths
19th-century American politicians
Place of birth missing
Place of death missing
People from Colleton County, South Carolina